Galametz is a commune in the Pas-de-Calais department in the Hauts-de-France region of France.

Geography
A small village situated some 20 miles (32 km) southeast of Montreuil-sur-Mer on the D340 road.

Population

Places of interest
 Church of St. Martin, dating from the eighteenth century.

See also
Communes of the Pas-de-Calais department

References

Communes of Pas-de-Calais
Artois